Çırak, is a film by Tayfun Belet made in 2014. The international name is "The Apprentice".

Synopsis
The film depicts the last parchment master in Turkey, which happens to be a woman despite it being viewed as a job for men. The circumstances and events that lead to this situation are shown in the documentary. The last parchment master happens to be in Bergama, where parchment was first created, and the documentary touches on the history of parchment itself.

Awards
 6. TRT Documentary Awards, International Professional Category, Republic Of Turkey Ministry Of Culture Tourism, Special Prize. 2014
 International Bergama Festival, Special Screening. 2014
 UNESCO, Success Award. 2014
 SABC Ekurhuleni International Film Festival, Finalist. 2016
 International Human District Film Festival, Official Selection. 2016
 International Amsterdam Craft in Focus Film Festival, Official Selection. 2016
 Matsalu Nature Film Festival, Finalist. 2016

References

External links

2014 films
Films set in İzmir
2010s Turkish-language films
Turkish short documentary films
Films shot in İzmir
2014 short documentary films